The 1950 Nevada gubernatorial election was held on November 7, 1950. Incumbent Democrat Vail Pittman ran unsuccessfully for re-election to a second term as Governor of Nevada. He was defeated by Republican nominee Charles H. Russell with 57.65% of the vote.

Primary elections
Primary elections were held on September 5, 1950.

Democratic primary

Candidates
Vail Pittman, incumbent Governor
Roland H. Wiley
Clem Malone
Simon W. Conwell
Charles Wilton Pipkin

Results

Republican primary

Candidates
Charles H. Russell, former U.S. Representative
Fred C. Horlacher
Ed Bender
Walter J. Richards
Ralph Morgali

Results

General election

Candidates
Charles H. Russell, Republican 
Vail M. Pittman, Democratic

Results

References

1950
Nevada
Gubernatorial